The 2023 Adamawa State gubernatorial election will take place on 18 March 2023, to elect the Governor of Adamawa State, concurrent with elections to the Adamawa State House of Assembly as well as twenty-seven other gubernatorial elections and elections to all other state houses of assembly. The election—which was postponed from its original 11 March date—will be held three weeks after the presidential election and National Assembly elections. Incumbent PDP Governor Ahmadu Umaru Fintiri has been renominated by his party.

The primaries, scheduled for between 4 April and 9 June 2022, resulted in Fintiri winning the Peoples Democratic Party primary unopposed on 26 May while the All Progressives Congress nominated Senator for Adamawa Central Aishatu Dahiru Ahmed on 25 May. Although a Federal High Court ruling nullified the APC primary on 14 October, an Appeal Court judgment overturned the nullification and reinstated Ahmed on 24 November.

Electoral system
The Governor of Adamawa State is elected using a modified two-round system. To be elected in the first round, a candidate must receive the plurality of the vote and over 25% of the vote in at least two-thirds of state local government areas. If no candidate passes this threshold, a second round will be held between the top candidate and the next candidate to have received a plurality of votes in the highest number of local government areas.

Background
Adamawa State is a large, diverse northeastern state in the process of recovering from the worst of the Boko Haram insurgency. The state also has to contend with an underdeveloped yet vital agricultural sector and low education rates along with continued security challenges from Boko Haram and ISWAP to sustained conflict between herders and farmers.

Politically, the 2019 Adamawa elections were a swing back to the PDP as its presidential nominee Atiku Abubakar won the state back from Buhari and Fintiri unseated APC Governor Bindo Jibrilla. Legislatively the PDP also gained ground, winning two Senate seats, five House of Representatives seats, and control of the House of Assembly. During Fintiri's term, his administration stated focuses included increased security, ethnic and religious harmony, and water resource management. In terms of his performance, Fintiri was commended for civil service reform while being criticized for having few accomplishments of his own and disregarding FAAN airport health protocols in July 2020.

Primary elections
The primaries, along with any potential challenges to primary results, were to take place between 4 April and 3 June 2022 but the deadline was extended to 9 June. According to some candidates and community leaders, an informal zoning gentlemen's agreement sets the Adamawa Central Senatorial District to have the next governor as since the 1999 return of democracy, all Adamawa governors have come from either the Adamawa South or Adamawa North Senatorial Districts. However, no major party has yet closed their primaries to candidates from the North or South.

All Progressives Congress 

On the primary date, the six candidates continued to an indirect primary in Yola that resulted in Aishatu Dahiru Ahmed—Senator for Adamawa Central and former member of the House of Representatives—emerging as the APC nominee after results showed her winning over 42% of the delegates' votes. Controversy arose during the primary when two of Ahmed's campaigners were arrested while caught bribing delegates and after the primary, accusation of overvoting led to internal debates. Later it was noted that Ahmed's nomination was the first time a woman had been nominated by a major party for the Adamawa governorship and only the second time a woman had been nominated by a major party for any state governorship. Post-primary analysis noted several failures from Ahmed's opponents and the success of Ahmed's campaign in picking off delegates expected to vote for others along with consolidating support from women delegates. However, about a month after the primary, first runner-up Nuhu Ribadu sued for the nullification of the primary based on the reports of vote-buying. Despite of the court proceedings, Ahmed continued her campaign and picked Titsi Ganama—a fellow former House of Representatives member—as her running mate. On 14 October, Ribadu's suit was ruled on with Judge Abdulaziz Anka siding with Ribadu in invalidating Ahmed's nomination due to overvoting in the primary; however, Anka did not name Ribadu as nominee or order a rerun primary and instead rendered the APC without a nominee for the gubernatorial election. Ahmed announced her intention to appeal the judgment later that week and a Court of Appeal judgment on 24 November ruled in her favour, reinstating Ahmed as nominee. Although Ribadu originally announced his intention to take the case to the Supreme Court, he withdrew the lawsuit in early December "for the larger good of the party."

Nominated 
 Aishatu Dahiru Ahmed: Senator for Adamawa Central (2019–present) and former House of Representatives member for Yola North/Yola South/Girei (2015–2019)
 Running mate—Titsi Ganama: former House of Representatives member for Madagali/Michika (2011–2015) and former Commissioner of Finance

Eliminated 
 Bindow Jibrilla: former Governor (2015–2019) and former Senator for Adamawa North (2011–2015)
 Umar Mustapha: engineer
 Abdulrazak Namdas: House of Representatives member for Jada/Ganye/Mayo Belwa/Toungo (2015–present)
 Nuhu Ribadu: 2019 APC gubernatorial candidate, 2015 PDP gubernatorial nominee, 2011 ACN presidential nominee, and former Chairman of the Economic and Financial Crimes Commission (2003–2007)
 Warfarninyi Theman: former state APC Secretary

Withdrew 
 Ishaku Elisha Abbo: Senator for Adamawa North (2019–present)

Declined 
 Mahmood Halilu Ahmed: 2019 APC gubernatorial candidate and brother of First Lady Aisha Buhari
 Abubakar Girei: former Senator for Adamawa Central (1999–2003)
 Boss Mustapha: Secretary to the Government of the Federation (2017–present), former Managing Director of the National Inland Waterways Authority (2016–2017), and 1991 SDP gubernatorial nominee
 Abdul-Aziz Nyako: former Senator for Adamawa Central (2015–2019) and 2019 ADC gubernatorial nominee

Results

People's Democratic Party 
On 16 March 2022, the national PDP announced its gubernatorial primaries' schedule, setting its expression of interest form price at ₦1 million and the nomination form price at ₦20 million with a 50% discount for candidates between 25 and 30. Forms were to be sold until 1 April but the party later extended the deadline four times before reaching a final deadline of 22 April. After the submission of nomination forms by 25 April, candidates were screened by a party committee on 28 April while 2 May was the rescheduled date for the screening appeal process. Ward congresses were set for 29 April and LGA congresses were rescheduled for 10 May to elect delegates for the primary. Candidates approved by the screening process advanced to a primary set for 25 May, in concurrence with all other PDP gubernatorial primaries; challenges to the result could be made in the following days.

Although there was significant controversy over the disqualification of Fintiri's only primary opponent a few days before the contest, the primary held peacefully with Fintiri as the sole candidate. After winning unopposed at the primary venue in Yola, Fintiri thanked the party delegates and urged the state party to support Atiku Abubakar's presidential primary campaign. About a month after the primary, Kaletapwa Farauta—the Vice-Chancellor of Adamawa State University and former Commissioner of Education from Numan—was picked as Fintiri's running mate instead of incumbent Deputy Governor Crowther Seth. At the formal unveiling event of Farauta as running mate in early August, Fintiri said he picked Farauta for a gender balanced ticket and praises Seth's service.

Nominated 
 Ahmadu Umaru Fintiri: Governor (2019–present), former House of Assembly member for Madagali (2007–2015), former acting Governor (2014), and former Speaker of the House of Assembly (2014)
 Running mate—Kaletapwa Farauta: Vice-Chancellor of Adamawa State University (2017–present) and former Commissioner of Education (2015–2017)

Disqualified by screening committee 
 Jameel Abubakar Waziri: former Aso Rock Presidential Villa chief of Protocol

Results

Minor parties 

 Hussaini Tahir (Action Alliance)
Running mate: Philip Andrew
 Muhammad Usman Shuwa (Action Democratic Party)
Running mate: Hamza Gurumpanwa Balisobso
 Abdulkadir Isa Adam (Action Peoples Party)
Running mate: Calvin Yusuf Pelene
 Umaru Babangida (African Democratic Congress)
Running mate: Victoria Yohana
 Bello Babajo (Allied Peoples Movement)
Running mate: Suleiman Salisu
 Yahaya Cholli (All Progressives Grand Alliance)
Running mate: Nasashiya Swade
 Umar Mustapha Madawaki (Labour Party)
Running mate: Samson Sunyammen Calvin
 Sa'ad Mohammed Chubado Tahir (New Nigeria Peoples Party)
Running mate: Nuhu Yati Luguja
 Maina Aliyu Abba (National Rescue Movement)
Running mate: Emmanuel John
 Ibrahim Baba-inna (People's Redemption Party)
Running mate: Rebecca Audu
 Umar Ardo (Social Democratic Party)
Running mate: Yusuf Amos Sunday
 Amron Dadou (Zenith Labour Party)
Running mate: Mohammed Yusuf

Campaign
In the months after the primaries, pundits noted the potential boost that Fintiri could receive due to Adamawa-native Atiku Abubakar's nomination to be the PDP presidential nominee; another issue for Ahmed was due to the APC presidential ticket—APC nominee Bola Tinubu's selection of Kashim Shettima created a Muslim-Muslim ticket, violating an unwritten convention against same religion tickets—with pundits noting the religious diversity of Adamawa and the opposition forming against the APC among northern Christians. There were also issues within the Adamawa APC as Nuhu Ribadu—runner-up in the gubernatorial primary—contested the primary results leading to an internal party crisis that culminated in the removal of state party chair Ibrahim Bilal in September 2022. Nonetheless, observers also noted Ahmed's strong support base among women voters and historic candidacy to become the first elected woman governor. Analysts claimed that Ahmed's popularity with women may have led Fintiri to drop incumbent Deputy Governor Crowther Seth as his running mate for Kaletapwa Farauta in order to achieve a gender balanced ticket. Another major factor was the ability for Fintiri to retain his support in the Numan area and among the Christian minority; both demographics were vital for Fintiri in 2019. By September, pundits were questioning the effects of misogyny against Ahmed and the political clout of respective running mates along with potential of the more prominent minor parties—Labour Party and Social Democratic Party.

However, the next month brought a massive shift to the race as the APC primary was annulled through a Federal High Court ruling that also refused to accede to a new primary, effectively barring the APC from the election. However, a Court of Appeal judgment in late November overturned the previous ruling, reinstating Ahmed as nominee. Despite the successful appeal and Ribadu's acceptance of the ruling, internal rifts created by the legal battle remained as Ahmed supporters feuded with backers of First Lady Aisha Buhari—who had reportedly argued for a Ribadu-led ticket if the Court of Appeal ordered the party to conduct a new primary.

By January 2023, campaigning intensified as litigation concluded and the election neared. Ahmed focused on women voters at rallies while Fintiri received the endorsement of the influential Church of the Brethren in Nigeria. Analysis from SMB Intelligence also noted ethnicity-based voting as a possibility (Ahmed is an ethnic Fulani while Fintiri is ethnically Marghi); however, the piece focused moreso on the influence of Abubakar on the race. The next month, focus switched to the presidential election on 25 February. In the election, Adamawa State voted for Atiku Abubakar (PDP); Abubakar won the state with 57.1% of the vote, beating Bola Tinubu (APC) at 25.0% and Peter Obi (LP) at 14.5%. Although the result was unsurprising as Adamawa is in Abubakar's home state and projections had favored him, the totals led to increased attention on Fintiri's chances in the gubernatorial race with the EiE-SBM forecast projecting Fintiri to win based on "the outcome of the presidential elections" while a Premium Times article noted the potential effect of ethnic dynamics. However, reporting from the Daily Post noted that Ahmed had been underestimated in previous elections and could receive a boost from Tinubu's vote in the presidential election. Observers also reiterated the significance of Ahmed's historic candidacy for women in the wake of the federal elections' backslide in female representation, especially considering allegations that the PDP had worked with misogynistic clerics in an attempt to discredit the possibility of a women becoming governor.

Projections

Conduct

Electoral timetable

General election

Results

By senatorial district 
The results of the election by senatorial district.

By federal constituency
The results of the election by federal constituency.

By local government area 
The results of the election by local government area.

See also 
 2023 Nigerian elections
 2023 Nigerian gubernatorial elections

Notes

References 

Adamawa State gubernatorial election
2023
2023 Adamawa State elections
Adamawa